Eublemmoides is a genus of moths of the family Noctuidae erected by George Thomas Bethune-Baker in 1906.

Species
Species in this genus are:
 Eublemmoides apicimacula (Mabille, 1880)
 Eublemmoides acrapex Hampson 1896
 Eublemmoides crassiuscula Walker 1864 
 Eublemmoides dinawa Bethune-Baker 1906 
 Eublemmoides ochracea Warren 1913 
 Eublemmoides pectorora (Lucas 1894)
 Eublemmoides rufiplaga Hampson 1910
 Eublemmoides semirufus Hampson 1902
 Eublemmoides subangulatus Hampson 1902

References

Acontiinae